Sinus pericranii (SP) is a rare disorder characterized by a congenital (or occasionally, acquired) epicranial venous malformation of the scalp.  Sinus pericranii is an abnormal communication between the intracranial and extracranial venous drainage pathways.  Treatment of this condition has mainly been recommended for aesthetic reasons and prevention of bleeding.

Signs and symptoms 
Sinus pericranii typically present as soft palpable masses along midline skull, which may fluctuate in size depending on body positioning. Classically, these lesions are not associated with color change of the overlying skin,  such as with other vascular lesions such as hemangioma.

Cause
The nature of this malformation remains unclear. Congenital, spontaneous, and acquired origins are accepted. The hypothesis of a spontaneous origin in the current case of SP is supported by no evidence of associated anomalies, such as cerebral aneurysmal venous malformations, systemic angiomas, venous angioma dural malformation, internal cerebral vein aneurysm, and cavernous hemangiomas.

Mechanism
Sinus pericranii is a venous anomaly where a communication between the intracranial dural sinuses and dilated epicranial venous structures exists. That venous anomaly is a collection of nonmuscular venous blood vessels adhering tightly to the outer surface of the skull and directly communicating with intracranial venous sinuses through diploic veins. The venous collections receive blood from and drain into the intracranial venous sinuses. The varicosities are intimately associated with the periosteum, are distensible, and vary in size when changes in intracranial pressure occur.

Diagnosis

Treatment
The surgical treatment involves the resection of the extracranial venous package and ligation of the emissary communicating vein. In some cases of SP, surgical excision is performed for cosmetic reasons. The endovascular technique has been described by transvenous approach combined with direct puncture and the recently endovascular embolization with Onyx.

See also 
 Mondor's disease
 List of cutaneous conditions

References 

Vascular-related cutaneous conditions
Cutaneous congenital anomalies